Ziggy is a masculine given name, often a diminutive form (hypocorism) of Zigmunt and other names. It is also a nickname. Notable people with the name include:

Nickname or hypocorism 
 Ezekiel Ansah (born 1989), National Football League player
 Zbigniew Brzezinski (1928-2017), United States National Security Advisor to President Jimmy Carter from 1977 to 1981
 Zygmont Czarobski (1922–1984), American College Football Hall-of-Fame and National Football League player
 Ziggy Gordon (born 1993), Scottish footballer
 Evander Ziggy Hood (born 1987), National Football League player
 Zachary Ziggy Lichman (born 1981), a contestant on the reality TV show Big Brother UK, Season 8
 Ziggy Lorenc (born 1958), Canadian television and radio personality
 David Nesta Ziggy Marley (born 1968), Grammy-winning Jamaican musician; oldest son of Bob Marley
 Ziggy Modeliste (born 1948), American drummer best known as a founding member of the funk group The Meters
 Ziggy Niszczot (born 1955), Australian former professional rugby league footballer
 Žigmund Pálffy (born 1972), retired National Hockey League player from Slovakia
 Sigurd Rosnes, Norwegian songwriter and producer
 Ilari Sahamies (born 1983), Finnish professional poker player
 David "Ziggy" Sigmond, guitarist for Canadian rock group Econoline Crush
 George Snider, American retired race car driver
 Zigmunt Ziggy Switkowski (born 1948), Australian businessman and nuclear physicist
 Zigmunt Zygi Wilf (born 1950), owner of the Minnesota Vikings National Football League team 
 Ziggy the bagman (born c. 1950), Zbygnew Marian Willzek, a homeless man who lives in Toowong, Brisbane, Australia
 Brad Ziegler (born 1979), relief pitcher for the Oakland Athletics

Technology 
 Ziggy, as a wake word and alternate name for Amazon Alexa, a virtual assistant developed by Amazon

Stage name
 Ziggy Alberts (born 1994), an Australian folk singer and songwriter
 Ziggy Elman, stage name of American jazz trumpeter Harry Aaron Finkelman (1914–1968)
 Ziggy Stardust, a 1970s persona of David Bowie (1947–2016), English musician, singer-songwriter, producer, actor and arranger
 Ziggy Ramo (born Ziggy Ramo Burrmuruk Fatnowna), an Indigenous Australian singer, songwriter and activist

Fictional characters 
 Ziggy, a character in Laura Bow 2
 The title character of Ziggy (comic strip)
 Ziggy (EastEnders), from the British soap opera EastEnders
 Ziggy Sobotka, on the HBO drama The Wire
 Ziggy, from the Icelandic children's television program LazyTown
 Ziggy (Quantum Leap), from the American TV series Quantum Leap
 Ziggy Grover, from Power Rangers RPM
 Ziggy (Xenosaga), from the science fiction video game series Xenosaga
 Ziggy from the Millimages cartoon Trust Me, I'm a Genie!
 Demon King Ziggy from the Japanese manga Edens Zero
 Ziggy Stardust (character), fictional alter ego of David Bowie
 Ziggy Chapman from the HBO series Big Little Lies.
 Ziggy Roscoe, character in British soap opera Hollyoaks

As a female nickname 
 Christine 'Ziggy' Berman from Fear Street: Part Two - 1978

Animals 
 Ziggy (elephant) (1917–1975), an Indian elephant who lived at the Brookfield Zoo outside Chicago

See also 
 Zigi, Ghanaian singer
 Ziggi Recado, reggae singer
 Siggy (disambiguation)
 Zig (disambiguation)
 Zygi, village in Cyprus
 Zygi (given name)

Masculine given names
Lists of people by nickname
Hypocorisms

it:Personaggi minori di PK#Zigfried Flagstarr